The Redwood Session is an album by saxophonist Evan Parker with bassist Barry Guy and drummer Paul Lytton recorded in 1995 which was the first release on the CIMP label.

Reception

AllMusic reviewer Scott Yanow stated "Those listeners with very open ears should find this set of interest".

The authors of the Penguin Guide to Jazz Recordings called the performances "non-vintage Parker/Guy/Lytton, fine in their way but lacking the intellectual command of previous discs."

In JazzTimes, Bill Shoemaker called the album "a well-engineered case in point that Parker's trio with bassist Barry Guy and drummer Paul Lytton is the premier improvised music ensemble of the '90s," and wrote: "The resulting listening experience is analogous to watching time-elapsed photography, an exciting compression of physical reality".

Track listing 
All compositions by Evan Parker, Barry Guy and Paul Lytton
 "Not Yet" - 12:47
 "The Masks" - 10:47
 "Craig's Story" - 14:10
 "Pedal (For Warren)" - 9:22
 "Then Paul Saw the Snake (For Susan)" - 11:59

Personnel 
Evan Parker - tenor saxophone, soprano saxophone
Barry Guy - bass
Paul Lytton - drums
Joe McPhee - trumpet (track 5)

References 

Evan Parker albums
1996 albums
CIMP albums